The 20th Metro Manila Film Festival was held in December 1994. This film festival is notable because no film won the award for Best Picture, the Gatpuno Antonio J. Villegas Cultural Awards, Best Director, and Best Screenplay. When asked on the absence of these awards, Board of Jurors chairman Alejandro Roces stated that none of the entries during that year were deserving of the awards. Furthermore, this film festival is different from the Manila Film Festival (MFF) that took place earlier that year, which was marked by a scandal over the recipient of the Best Actor and Best Actress award.

Entries

Winners and nominees

Awards
Winners are listed first and highlighted in boldface.

{| class=wikitable
|-
! style="background:#EEDD82; width:50%" | Best Film
! style="background:#EEDD82; width:50%" | Best Director
|-
| valign="top" |
None
| valign="top" |
None
|-
! style="background:#EEDD82; width:50%" | Best Actor
! style="background:#EEDD82; width:50%" | Best Actress
|-
| valign="top" |
Roi Vinzon – Lucas Abelardo
| valign="top" |
Kimberly Diaz – Kanto Boy 2: Anak ni Totoy Guapo
|-
! style="background:#EEDD82; width:50%" | Best Supporting Actor
! style="background:#EEDD82; width:50%" | Best Supporting Actress
|-
| valign="top" |
Dick Israel – Kanto Boy 2: Anak ni Totoy Guapo
| valign="top" |
Teresa Loyzaga – Lucas Abelardo
|-
! style="background:#EEDD82; width:50%" | Best Art Direction
! style="background:#EEDD82; width:50%" | Best Cinematography
|-
| valign="top" |
Ben Payumo – Ang Pagbabalik ni Pedro Penduko
| valign="top" |
Ben Lobo - Ang Pagbabalik ni Pedro Penduko|-
! style="background:#EEDD82; width:50%" | Best Child Performer
! style="background:#EEDD82; width:50%" | Best Editing
|-
| valign="top" |Tom Taus, Jr. – Shake, Rattle & Roll V| valign="top" |
Renato de Leon - Lucas Abelardo
|-
! style="background:#EEDD82; width:50%" | Best Story
! style="background:#EEDD82; width:50%" | Best Screenplay
|-
| valign="top" |
Joe Balagtas – Lucas Abelardo
| valign="top" |None|-
! style="background:#EEDD82; width:50%" | Best Original Song
! style="background:#EEDD82; width:50%" | Best Music
|-
| valign="top" |
Rey Magtoto – Lucas Abelardo
| valign="top" |
Jaime Fabregas - Kanto Boy 2: Anak ni Totoy Guapo
|-
! style="background:#EEDD82; width:50%" | Best Visual Effects
! style="background:#EEDD82; width:50%" | Best Make-up
|-
| valign="top" |
Cinemagic – Ang Pagbabalik ni Pedro Penduko
| valign="top" |
Rey Salamat – Ang Pagbabalik ni Pedro Penduko
|-
! style="background:#EEDD82; width:50%" | Best Sound Recording
! style="background:#EEDD82; width:50%" | Best Float
|-
| valign="top" |
Rolly Ruta - Lucas Abelardo
| valign="top" |'Ang Pagbabalik ni Pedro Penduko - VIVA Films'|-
! style="background:#EEDD82; width:50%" | Gatpuno Antonio J. Villegas Cultural Awards
|-
| valign="top" |None|}

Multiple awards

Ceremony information
Lack of award-winners
During the "Gabi ng Parangal" held in PICC, December 27 of Tuesday night, Alejandro Roces, chairman of the Board of Jurors announced that: "none of the entries was deserving". Therefore, the six major awards (Three Best Pictures, Gatpuno Antonio J. Villegas Cultural Awards, Best Director, and Best Screenplay) were not given."Through the years: Controversies in the MMFF". Business World Online. Retrieved April 9, 2014. On the side note, the Manila Film Fest (MFF) had a similar, but different case in which both the Best Actress and Best Actor awards were given to Ruffa Gutierrez and Gabby Concepcion respectively instead of the supposed-to-be winners."Filipino Actress Steals The Show". Chicago Tribune. Retrieved April 20, 2014. Manila Standard'' columnist Emil P. Jurado praised the jurors' decision not to give out the major awards, stating that "[u]nless and until our filmmakers raise their professional and moral standards, the festival serves no purpose."

Notes

References

External links

Metro Manila Film Festival
MMFF
MMFF